Ismail bin Mohamed is a Malaysian politician. He was the Member of Johor State Legislative Assembly for Bukit Serampang and Johor State Executive Councillor.

Election Results

References 

Living people
People from Johor
Malaysian people of Malay descent
Malaysian Muslims
 United Malays National Organisation politicians
21st-century Malaysian politicians
Year of birth missing (living people)
Members of the Johor State Legislative Assembly
Johor state executive councillors